The Williams Center is an arts center and cinema complex located in downtown Rutherford, New Jersey. The center was named after the Pulitzer prize winning poet and physician William Carlos Williams. The building that the center occupies was originally built in the 1920s as a Vaudeville theater known as the Rivoli. The Rivoli soon started showing silent movies and eventually "talkies". The theater enjoyed success until a fire destroyed part of the building in 1977. In 1978 a group of philanthropists started the Williams Center Project which opened the Center in 1982. The center currently has two live theaters, three cinemas, and an open-air meeting gallery. As of 2021, the town of Rutherford sold the center to local real estate developer Native Development.

Current uses 
On July 29, 2016, the three cinemas and downstairs floor reopened for first run movies after successful fundraising to switch from 35mm projectors to digital.  This includes a refurbished concession stand, lobby and a party room which has now been turned into an arcade. The building is currently undergoing a large-scale renovation while hosting weekly art and music events.

History 
The Rivoli Theater debuted in Rutherford in April 1922 with a capacity for 2,200 audience members. Built by architect Abram Preiskel and developer Harry Hecht above the Glen Waters pond, the building featured a marble facade, ornate proscenium, and a centerpiece chandelier, made of 62,000 Czechoslovakian crystals. The theater played host to silent films and was a popular stop in the vaudeville circuit. Acts such as Abbott and Costello and the Glenn Miller Orchestra performed under The Rivoli's signature chandelier, and silent movies starring Buster Keaton and Douglas Fairbanks, Jr., delighted audiences. The Theater continued operation with brief interruptions until January 1977, when a devastating fire destroyed nearly one third of the building. The theater's future was in doubt until a group of philanthropists led by Fairleigh Dickinson, Peter and Sally Sammartino, Oscar Schwidetsky, Barry Dancy and Herb Cutter, saved the theater and started the nonprofit Williams Center Project. The theater's name was changed to the William Carlos Williams Center for the Performing Arts, after the famed poet, doctor, and Rutherford native, and the newly renovated venue opened its doors in 1982.

In 1987, the building was deeded to Bergen County and a lease agreement was reached with the nonprofit group to continue operating the center. The center continued to serve the community as a host to live theater, music shows, movies, and art shows, and functioned as a hub for the community, as many Rutherfordians will remember graduating from Rutherford High School on its stage.

Another setback struck the center in the aftermath of Superstorm Sandy.  In October 2012, Bergen County, the owner of the building, decided to shutter the Newman Theater, the main live stage of the Williams Center with a 642-seat capacity, due to safety concerns.

As of 2021, Native Development has been actively renovating and restoring several areas of the Williams Center.

References

Cinemas and movie theaters in New Jersey
Theatres in New Jersey
Performing arts centers in New Jersey
Rutherford, New Jersey
Buildings and structures in Bergen County, New Jersey
Tourist attractions in Bergen County, New Jersey